King of Hearts is the fourth studio album by American R&B recording artist Lloyd, released July 5, 2011, on Zone 4. Production for the album took place at several recording studios and was handled primarily by producer and Zone 4-head Polow da Don. It is Lloyd's first release after leaving his former record label Murder Inc. Records in 2009.

The album debuted at number 10 on the US Billboard 200 chart, selling 26,000 copies in its first week. Upon its release, King of Hearts received positive reviews from most music critics, who commended Lloyd's singing and Polow da Don's production, although some criticized its songwriting.

Background 
After releasing three albums for The Inc. Records, Lloyd left the record label in 2009 due to creative differences. He subsequently released an eight-track EP, Like Me: The Young Goldie EP, as a free download on the Internet. In 2010, Lloyd was featured on the Young Money hit single "BedRock" and signed to Zone 4, the label of producer and longtime friend Polow da Don. He previously worked with Lloyd on the latter's 2008 album Lessons in Love.

Recording 
Recording sessions for the album took place at Doppler Studios in Atlanta, Georgia, No Excuses Studio in Santa Monica, California, Record Plant in Hollywood, California, and Setai Recording Studios in Miami, Florida. Polow da Don served as the album's executive producer and produced or co-produced all of its songs, managing sessions with background singers and horn and string sections. In an interview for Billboard, he said of his role on the album, "I promised [Lloyd] my full dedication. So I stopped doing a lot of work with a lot of other artists. I usually have seven songs on the radio at the same time, but I shut down shop to focus on his album". Lloyd has said of the album's music, "We've created something in the likes of what Justin Timberlake and Timbaland were able to create [on FutureSex/LoveSounds] and Usher and Jermaine Dupri were able to create [on Confessions]".

Release and promotion 
The album was released by Zone 4, with distribution through Interscope Records. It was released on July 5, 2011, in the United Kingdom, and on July 6 in the United States. In promotion of the album, Lloyd will accompany rapper Lil Wayne on the second leg of his I Am Music II tour during the summer.

Singles 
The album's lead single, "Lay It Down", was released on August 31, 2010. It peaked at number 64 on the US Billboard Hot 100 and at number seven on the US Hot R&B/Hip-Hop Songs chart, becoming Lloyd's fourth top-ten hit on the chart. The second single "Cupid" peaked at number 11 on the Hot R&B/Hip-Hop Songs.

"Dedication To My Ex (Miss That)", which features Andre 3000 and Lil Wayne, was released as the third single on August 9. "Be the One", which features Trey Songz and Young Jeezy, was originally planned to be the third single. A music video for the song was still released on December 19.

Reception

Commercial performance 
The album debuted at number 10 on the US Billboard 200 chart, with first-week sales of 26,000 copies in the United States. It is Lloyd's third top-10 album in the US. As of July 20, 2011, King of Hearts has sold 35,600 copies in the US, according to Nielsen SoundScan.

Critical response 

King of Hearts received positive reviews from most music critics. At Metacritic, which assigns a normalized rating out of 100 to reviews from mainstream critics, the album received an average score of 77, based on 12 reviews, which indicates "generally favorable reviews". AllMusic editor Andy Kellman called it "clearly the singer’s best album yet [...] his most unified set of songs", adding that "Lloyd has pretty much perfected the art of transcending the modern-R&B Lothario cliché". Maura Johnston of The Village Voice described the album as "utterly replayable" and commented that it "veers back and forth between unabashed romanticism [...], club-borne lust [...], and the brooding, yet unleashed love songs that helped him initially break onto the scene". The A.V. Clubs Evan Rytlewski complimented Polow da Don's material for Lloyd and wrote that the album "doubles down on his amorous enthusiasm, pushing it to such delirious extremes that these songs feel risky and uncharted even as they play to his most obvious strengths". Glenn Gamboa of Newsday called it "ambitious" and commended Lloyd as "a bold thinker and a skillful singer". Pitchforks David Drake praised "the chemistry of Lloyd with producer Polow da Don", writing that "his work is primarily devoted to underlining Lloyd's vocals for maximum impact." Drake commented that the album "takes a major step toward streamlining his sound, pushing Lloyd's voice to the center and making a bid for a higher level of recognition in the R&B world," and elaborated on its musical significance, stating:

However, Ken Capobianco of The Boston Globe found its songwriting "weak" and stated, "Lloyd shows little nuance, and Polow Da Don doesn’t color in the tracks with enough interesting musical flourishes to mask some of the vocalist’s weaknesses". Slant Magazine's Matthew Cole criticized its "trendy production choices" and found its songs ill-suited for Lloyd, writing that he "fares best when he stays on the sillier, sexier side of things". Despite calling it a "strong-laced R&B vocal album", Mireya Fernandez of The Source perceived an "inability to definitively differentiate from the vast sea of other R&B singers". The Washington Posts Allison Stewart complimented "Dedication to My Ex (Miss That)", but stated, "it’s the first and only track on King of Hearts to inspire any kind of strong reaction at all". Los Angeles Times writer Jeff Weiss commented that "Lloyd possesses a levitating croon and admirably fills out most of producer Polow Da Don’s synthetic boudoir songs", while noting "not a cliché left unemployed". Jon Caramanica of The New York Times viewed a lack of "focus" with the songs, but commended Polow da Don for "feeling the full range of [Lloyd's] lushness" in his production. Rolling Stone writer Jody Rosen commended its "salacious silliness" and compared Lloyd to recording artist R. Kelly. Steve Jones of USA Today stated, "it's Lloyd's energetic but smooth deliveries that create a diverse set of keepers".

Track listing

Notes
 (co.) Co-producer
1Alias for Polow da Don

Personnel 
Credits for King of Hearts adapted from Allmusic.

 Brian Allison – assistant, assistant engineer
 Marcella Araica – mixing
 Matt Benefield – assistant, assistant engineer
 André Benjamin – composer
 Joshua Berg – assistant
 Timothy Bloom – background vocals
 India Boodram – background vocals, vocal producer
 Jason "Pooh Bear" Boyd – composer, producer
 Veronika Bozeman – producer, vocal producer
 Chris Brown – composer
 Matt Champlin – assistant engineer
 Kelvin Chu – A&R
 W. Clarke – composer
 Corey Shoemaker – engineer
 Greg Curtis – composer, keyboards, producer
 Paul "Hot Sauce" Dawson – guitar, keyboards, producer
 DJ Mormile – A&R
 "Angry" Mike Eleopoulos – assistant, assistant engineer, engineer, mixing engineer
 Ken Fambro – composer, producer
 Cliff Feiman – production supervisor
 Iain Findlay – assistant
 Mike Fontana – assistant, assistant engineer
 Full Circle – composer
 Chris Galland – assistant
 Jesus Garnica – assistant
 B. Green – composer
 Daniel Gruber – guitar
 Patrick "Guitarboy" Hayes – guitar
 Clifford Henson – composer, producer
 Keri Hilson – arranger, background vocals
 Kesia Hollins – background vocals, vocal producer
 Jean-Marie Horvat – mixing
 Ghazi Hourani – assistant, assistant engineer
 Jaycen Joshua – mixing
 Polow A. Jones – composer, vocal producer

 Josh Mosser – assistant, engineer, keyboards
 Robert S. Kelly – composer
 Martin Kierszenbaum – A&R
 King David – drums, keyboards, percussion, piano, producer
 K'naan – composer
 Henry "Noonie" Lee, Jr. – executive producer
 Lil Wayne – composer, narrator
 Ryon Jermain Lovett – composer
 Erik Madrid – mixing engineer
 David Manzoor – composer, keyboards
 Manny Marroquin – mixing
 Justine Massa – creative coordinator
 Justin Merrill – assistant engineer, engineer
 Jonathan Merritt – assistant engineer, engineer, mixing engineer
 Jazmyn Michel – background vocals, vocal producer
 Mizzle Boy – producer
 Brian Morton – assistant, engineer
 Tremaine Aldon Neverson – composer
 Jason "JP" Perry – bass, keyboards, strings
 Keithin "Mizzle Boy" Pittman – composer
 Lloyd Polite Jr. – composer, executive producer
 Polow da Don – executive producer, producer
 Tameka Raymond – stylist
 Dan Rockett – bass, guitar, piano, producer
 Will Sandels – engineer
 Tony Scales – composer
 Donnie Scantz – keyboards, mixing
 Zach Steele – assistant engineer
 Jeremy Stevenson – assistant, engineer, mixing
 Corey Stocker – engineer
 Theron Thomas – composer
 Timothy Thomas – composer
 Tron "Teezy T" Thomas - composer
 Titi Boi – composer
 P. Wright – composer
 Young Jeezy – composer

Charts

Weekly charts

Year-end charts

References

External links 
 
 King of Hearts at Metacritic

2011 albums
Albums produced by Polow da Don
Lloyd (singer) albums
Albums produced by 1500 or Nothin'